Frank Mariman (born 1 May 1958) is a Belgian footballer. He played in one match for the Belgium national football team in 1981.

References

External links
 

1958 births
Living people
Belgian footballers
Belgium international footballers
Place of birth missing (living people)
Association football defenders